Platinum Game is the second studio album by American rapper CJ Mac. It was released on August 31, 1999 through Hoo-Bangin'/Priority Records. Production was handled by Young Trey, Mad, DJ Crazy Toones, Ant Banks, DJ Battlecat and Johnny "J", with Mack 10 serving as executive producer. It features guest appearances from WC, Big Pimpin' Delemond, Fat Joe, Finale, Soultre, Too Short, TQ, La' Reece and Barbara Wilson. The album peaked at number 77 on the Billboard Top R&B/Hip-Hop Albums and at number 42 on the Billboard Heatseekers Albums.

Along with a single, a music video was released for the song "Imagine That" and has a cameo appearance by MC Eiht. The songs "King Of L.A." & "Hate" were later used in Richard Cummings Jr.'s 1999 film Thicker than Water, and were also included in its soundtrack.

Track listing

Personnel
Bryaan "CJ Mac" Ross – main artist, rap vocals
William "WC" Calhoun Jr. – featured artist (tracks: 1, 8)
Joseph "Fat Joe" Cartagena – featured artist (track 1)
Terrence "TQ" Quaites – featured artist (track 2)
Barbara Wilson – backing vocals (tracks: 5, 7)
Derek "Finale" Cooper – featured artist (track 8)
Soultre – featured artist (track 9)
Lareece – backing vocals (tracks: 10, 11)
Todd "Too $hort" Shaw – featured artist (track 13)
Delemond "Big Pimpin Delemond" Williams – featured artist (track 14)
Clement "Mad" Burnette – producer (tracks: 1, 11)
Treyvon "Young Tre" Green – producer (tracks: 2, 7, 9, 14)
Lamar "DJ Crazy Toones" Calhoun – producer (tracks: 4, 10)
Johnny Lee Jackson – producer (track 5)
Kevin "DJ Battlecat" Gilliam – producer (track 8)
Anthony Banks – producer (track 13)
Dedrick "Mack 10" Rolison – mixing, executive producer
Carlos Warlick – mixing
Brian Gardner – mastering
Jason Clark – artwork
Ken Hollis – photography
David Green – A&R

Chart history

References

External links

1999 albums
CJ Mac albums
Priority Records albums
Albums produced by Ant Banks
Albums produced by Johnny "J"
Albums produced by Battlecat (producer)